Jacobus Jonker is a paralympic athlete from South Africa competing mainly in category F36 throwing events.

Jacobus was part of the South African team that competed in the 1996 Summer Paralympics where as well as competing in the discus he won a silver medal in the F36 javelin.

References

External links
 

Paralympic athletes of South Africa
Athletes (track and field) at the 1996 Summer Paralympics
Paralympic silver medalists for South Africa
Living people
Medalists at the 1996 Summer Paralympics
Year of birth missing (living people)
Paralympic medalists in athletics (track and field)
South African male javelin throwers
20th-century South African people
21st-century South African people